Qarahchi-ye Sofla (also Romanized as Qarahchī-ye Soflá and Qarehchī-ye Soflá; also known as Qarahchī-ye Pā'īn) is a village in Arshaq-e Shomali Rural District, Arshaq District, Meshgin Shahr County, Ardabil Province, Iran. At the 2006 census, its population was 248, in 54 families.

References 

Towns and villages in Meshgin Shahr County